Operation Lentil may refer to:

 Operation Lentil (Caucasus), deportation of populations by Soviet Union
 Operation Lentil (Sumatra), British naval air attack on Japanese installations